Any Woman Can is a Canadian home improvement television series which aired on CTV between October 1974 and September 1975. Hosted by Monica Parker, the show featured home repair tips for homemakers such as small machine repairs.

External links
 Any Woman Can from Canadian Communications Foundation

1974 Canadian television series debuts
1975 Canadian television series endings
CTV Television Network original programming
Home renovation television series